Mahon River Lighthouse is a U.S. lighthouse in Port Mahon, Delaware, on the west side of the mouth of the Delaware River.

History
The original Mahon River Lighthouse built in 1903 and was a 2-story wood keeper's house with an octagonal lantern centered on the roof. It was discontinued in 1955, the same year as the current steel skeletal tower was lit. The 1903 lighthouse burned accidentally in 1984. The clubhouse of the Jonathan's Landing Golf Course in Magnolia was built as a replica of the original lighthouse. The current tower is an active aid to navigation and not open to the public.

It was listed on the National Register of Historic Places in 1979.

References

External links

Lighthouses on the National Register of Historic Places in Delaware
Lighthouses completed in 1903
Lighthouses in Kent County, Delaware
Historic American Buildings Survey in Delaware
National Register of Historic Places in Kent County, Delaware